John and Phineas Hough House, also known as "Twin Arches," is a historic home located at Lower Makefield Township, Bucks County, Pennsylvania. The original two-bay stone house was expanded to its present form in about 1840 with the addition of a two bay section. It is a -story, four bay dwelling in the Federal style.  The front facade features an arcade of two Roman arches added about 1801 to the original dwelling.  Also on the property is a contributing stone spring house.  The original section of the house is believed to date as early as 1700, and considered the oldest documented stone house in Bucks County.

It was added to the National Register of Historic Places in 1992.

References

Houses on the National Register of Historic Places in Pennsylvania
Federal architecture in Pennsylvania
Houses completed in 1801
Houses in Bucks County, Pennsylvania
National Register of Historic Places in Bucks County, Pennsylvania